Baillou is a commune in the Loir-et-Cher department in central France. Notable buildings are the church of Saint-Jean-Baptiste and the Château de Baillou whose vast property spans most of the region.

The history of Baillou is inherently linked to the Baillou family, one of the oldest aristocratic families and landowners in Europe.

Population

See also
Communes of the Loir-et-Cher department
Baillo

References

Communes of Loir-et-Cher